Herakles is a passive electronically scanned array multi-function radar manufactured by Thales Group. It is installed on board the FREMM multipurpose frigates and the Formidable-class frigates of the Republic of Singapore Navy.

It has a track capacity of 400 air and surface targets and is able to achieve automatic target detection, confirmation and track initiation in a single scan, while simultaneously providing mid-course guidance updates to the MBDA Aster missiles launched from the ship.

References

Naval radars
Military radars of France
Military equipment introduced in the 2000s